Inoscavins are chemical compounds isolated from Phellinus linteus.

See also 
 Inoscavin A

References 

Hispidins
Phellinus